Marcelo Cirino da Silva (born 22 January 1992 in Maringá) is a Brazilian footballer who plays as a forward for Athletico Paranaense.

He previously had played for Atlético Paranaense, winning the Brazilian Série A best newcomer award in 2013 and Vitória.

Career
Born in Maringá, Paraná, Marcelo graduated from Atlético Paranaense's youth setup.

Atlético Paranaense
Cirino made his professional debut on 7 June 2009, playing the last 30 minutes of a 0–4 home loss against Atlético Mineiro for the Série A championship.

Marcelo scored his first goal on 15 November, netting his side's only in a 1–2 away defeat against Fluminense. He was also mainly a backup in the following campaign, appearing in only ten matches.

Vitória (loan)
On 15 March 2011 Marcelo was loaned to Vitória, in a season-long deal. As third-choice, he contributed with 15 appearances and one goal.

Atlético Paranaense return
Marcelo returned to Furacão in January 2012, and was an undisputed starter during the club's promotion campaign from Série B, scoring 16 goals and being top scorer. He was also an important attacking unit in the following year, being mostly deployed as a right winger and scoring seven goals, being awarded the tournament's best newcomer.

On 15 January 2014 Marcelo signed a new two-year deal with the club.

Flamengo
Cirino transferred to Flamengo from Atlético Paranaense on 2 January 2015. His signing was the highest fee paid in the club's history reaching the sum around R$16.5 million.

On 17 February 2017, Internacional came to terms with Flamengo and Atlético Paranaense (owner of 50% of the player's federative rights) to sign Cirino on loan until the end of 2017 season. Despite the previous agreement Internacional forfeited the offer on 6 March 2017.

Al Nasr (loan)
In his first international experience, Cirino joined Al Nasr Dubai in a one-year loan deal with Atlético Paranaense on 3 August 2017.

Career statistics

Honours

Club
Athletico Paranaense
 Campeonato Paranaense: 2009
 Copa Sudamericana: 2018
 J.League Cup / Copa Sudamericana Championship: 2019
 Copa do Brasil: 2019

Individual
 Campeonato Brasileiro Série A Best Newcomer: 2013

References

External links
 
 IG Esporte profile 

1992 births
Living people
People from Maringá
Brazilian footballers
Association football forwards
Campeonato Brasileiro Série A players
Campeonato Brasileiro Série B players
UAE Pro League players
Chinese Super League players
Club Athletico Paranaense players
Esporte Clube Vitória players
CR Flamengo footballers
Sport Club Internacional players
Al-Nasr SC (Dubai) players
Chongqing Liangjiang Athletic F.C. players
Esporte Clube Bahia players
Brazilian expatriate footballers
Expatriate footballers in the United Arab Emirates
Brazilian expatriate sportspeople in the United Arab Emirates
Expatriate footballers in China
Brazilian expatriate sportspeople in China
Sportspeople from Paraná (state)